Watkins Moorman Abbitt Jr. (born October 20, 1944) was an American politician. He was a former member of the Virginia House of Delegates.

Biography
Abbitt was born in Appomattox, Virginia. He attended Ferrum College in Ferrum, Virginia, and earned a BS in Economics from Virginia Commonwealth University in Richmond, Virginia. He was elected to the Virginia House of Delegates in 1985 and served from 1986 until his retirement in 2012. He did not seek re-election in 2011 and was succeeded by Matt Fariss.  The American Conservative Union gave him a 100% evaluation in 2011.

Originally a Democrat, he switched to independent status in 2001 and started caucusing with the Republicans. Until 2012, Abbitt represented the 59th district in the Virginia Piedmont, including four counties and parts of three others.

Abbitt and his wife Madeline Ganley resided in Appomattox, Virginia.

Abbitt's father, Watkins Abbitt Sr., was a member of the United States House of Representatives 1948–1973.

References

External links

"Appomattox Delegate Watkins Abbitt will not seek reelection", 5/18/2011

The Political Graveyard
Project Vote Smart

1944 births
Living people
Virginia Democrats
Members of the Virginia House of Delegates
Virginia Independents
People from Appomattox, Virginia
Virginia Commonwealth University alumni
Ferrum College alumni
20th-century American politicians
21st-century American politicians